Daginaagiin Törbat (born July 31, 1992) is a Mongolian footballer who plays as a defender for Mongolian Premier League club Athletic 220 and captains the Mongolian national team. He currently has one goal to his name for The Blue Wolves.

Making his debut just aged 16, Törbat quoted that "When I was in high school...there was no football...not even a ball." He believes that football in Mongolia is rapidly permeating into Mongolia and has the potential to be a popular sport.

2014

Representative ambassador Deco chose Törbat and Phon Chanudom for his Star Selection to face him and four other ex-Portugal teammates in the final staged in Singapore.

2016

Countering EAFF minnows Northern Mariana Islands, the one solitary goal he scored was a powerful header into the back of the net.

International goals
Scores and results list Mongolia's goal tally first.

References

External links
 
 

Living people
1992 births
Mongolian footballers
Mongolia international footballers
Khoromkhon players
Athletic 220 players
Association football defenders